The Miss International Luxembourg is a beauty pageant which selects Miss Luxembourg to the Miss International pageant.

History
Luxembourg was debuted at the Miss International beauty pageant in 1960 by Miss Luxembourg contest. In 2013 Luxembourg comes from Katia Maes directorship in Miss International history. The winner of Miss International Luxembourg may come at the Miss International beauty pageant which mostly happens in Japan. The reigning title is expected to serve as Ambassador of Peace in the Netherlands.

Titleholders
Color key

Miss Luxembourg 1960-1996

References

External links
 missitems.be
 Miss International Luxembourg

Recurring events established in 2013